The Englishman's Library was an English book series of the 1840s, a venture of the publisher James Burns. It ran eventually to 31 volumes.

The title had been used already in 1824, for The Englishman's library, edited by E. H. L., published by Charles Knight. The series was announced in ambitious fashion in the British Critic. It was started by William Gresley and Edward Churton, with propagandistic aims; the works are still a source for the "condition of England" debate of the time. Gresley wrote six novels for the series.

Aims
According to its prospectus, the Library aimed to "unite a popular style with sound Christian principles". The announced authors did not in fact all contribute.

Those behind the series were younger High Church men who wished to imitate some of the success of the Tracts for the Times. They were less hostile to the Tractarians than older, more orthodox members of the Hackney Phalanx.

List of volumes

The Juvenile Englishman's Library
Paget as editor started a children's book collection, The Juvenile Englishman's Library, in 1844. It was inspired in part by the success of Edgar Taylor's English translations of Grimm's Fairy Tales. The series ran to 21 titles. Later John Fuller Russell was editor. Volume 4, Popular Tales (1844), had translation of fairy tales by Friedrich de la Motte Fouqué, Wilhelm Hauff and Karl Spindler. Four volumes were by John Mason Neale.

References

External links
Publisher's announcement 1841 (12 volumes): 

Lists of books
1840s books
Series of books